Pålægschokolade ("chocolate to put on bread") are thin slices of chocolate (or vekao) that are used as a topping (in Danish, pålæg) on bread, such as rugbrød or white bread, similar to how chocolate spread is used in many countries. It is common in Denmark.

It is available in both milk and dark chocolate, with the milk variety being more common (the Danish confectionery Toms sells 70% milk and 30% dark).

It was originally introduced to the Danish market by Galle & Jessen in 1963.

Producers
 Toms
 Galle & Jessen
 Carletti

See also

 Vlokken
 Sprinkles

References

Chocolate
Danish cuisine
Danish chocolate